Johnatan Opoku (born 18 April 1990) is a Dutch footballer who plays as an attacking midfielder for Saudi Arabian club Jeddah.

Career
On 13 September 2022, Opoku joined Saudi Arabian club Jeddah.

Personal life
Born in the Netherlands, Opoku is of Ghanaian descent.

References

External links
 

Living people
1990 births
Footballers from Arnhem
Association football midfielders
Dutch footballers
Dutch expatriate footballers
Dutch people of Ghanaian descent
SC Veendam players
TOP Oss players
VVV-Venlo players
De Graafschap players
Jeddah Club players
Eredivisie players
Eerste Divisie players
Saudi First Division League players
Dutch expatriate sportspeople in Saudi Arabia
Expatriate footballers in Saudi Arabia